Roh Gyeong-tae (born 1972) is a South Korean film producer, director and screenwriter.

Personal life 
Born in 1972, Roh studied at KAIST and was a former stockbroker at Sam-Sung Securities Company. He later graduated with Master of Fine Arts from San Francisco Art Institute.

Career 
Roh made numerous experimental short films before he debuted with his first feature film The Last Dining Table in 2006. He emerged as a major talent with his second feature Land of Scarecrows (2008) which won and shared the New Currents Award with Masahide Ichii's Naked of Defenses at the 2008 Busan International Film Festival.

Filmography 
The Last Dining Table (2006) – director, screenwriter
Land of Scarecrows (2008) – director, screenwriter, producer, writer
Black Dove (2011) – director, script editor
Black Stone (2015) – director, screenwriter, producer

References

External links 
 
 
 

1972 births
Living people
South Korean film directors
South Korean screenwriters
KAIST alumni